Coleophora luciennella is a moth of the family Coleophoridae. It is found in France.

References

luciennella
Moths of Europe